Janneke Boonzaaijer (born 6 September 1996) is a Dutch equestrian. She represented the Netherlands at the 2020 Summer Olympics and competed in Individual Eventing on her horse Champ de Tailleur.

References 

1996 births
Living people
Dutch female equestrians
Olympic equestrians of the Netherlands
Equestrians at the 2020 Summer Olympics
Event riders
21st-century Dutch women